Robert Harris Phillips  (April 8, 1917 – July 21, 1992) was an American professional basketball player. He played in one game for the Indianapolis Kautskys in the National Basketball League.

References

1917 births
1992 deaths
Amateur Athletic Union men's basketball players
American men's basketball players
United States Army personnel of World War II
Basketball players from Gary, Indiana
Guards (basketball)
Indianapolis Kautskys players
Michigan State Spartans men's basketball players